The 2008–09 season was Manchester City Football Club's seventh consecutive season playing in the Premier League, the top division of English football, and its twelfth season since the Premier League was first created with Manchester City as one of its original 22 founding member clubs. Overall, it was the team's 117th season playing in a division of English football, the majority of which have been spent in the top-flight.

Changes in ownership 
The club started the season under the private ownership of UK Sports Investments Limited (UKSIL), a company controlled by former Thailand prime minister Thaksin Shinawatra, but it was announced on the morning of Monday 1 September 2008 (the last day of the summer transfer window) that Abu Dhabi-based Abu Dhabi United Group Investment and Development Limited (ADUG) had completed a takeover of Manchester City in a deal worth a reported £200 million. This transaction made Sheikh Mansour bin Zayed Al Nahyan the new owner of the club, although initially he kept a very low profile and Dr. Sulaiman Al-Fahim, who was the board member of ADUG that had presided over the signing of the deal at the Emirates Palace Hotel, was widely believed to be the new owner and potential chairman of the club. However, before the takeover was finally completed, wealthy backer Mansour bin Zayed Al Nahyan became more prominent and it was eventually made clear that Al-Fahim would not be joining the board at Manchester City, with Khaldoon Al Mubarak being appointed as the club's new chairman.

The last-minute takeover of the club on transfer "deadline-day" was further capped, mere minutes before the summer transfer window closed, with the news that the club had beaten Chelsea to the signing of Robinho from Real Madrid for a British record transfer fee of £32.5 million.

Kit 
Supplier: Le Coq Sportif / Sponsor: Thomas Cook

Kit information 
For this season the shirt sponsor for all of the club's kits continued to be the previous season's sponsor, Thomas Cook, while the team kits were produced by the previous season's supplier, Le Coq Sportif. The home and away kits were unveiled by the club on 27 June 2008, with the new away kit representing a more modern rendition of the club's highly popular red and black striped shirts and black shorts that had first been introduced as a club kit by Malcolm Allison back in 1968 in imitation of A.C. Milan's classic colors. A striking new "blaze orange"/navy third kit completed the collection of kits, while the team's main home strip shed the previous season's thin white vertical stripes from the shirts and returned to the solid sky blue shirts that are more traditionally associated with the team. As well as all three of the team kits being new this season, the previous season's two-tone green goalkeeper strip was also replaced with two new strips for the goalkeepers. The main goalkeeper strip, intended primarily for use with the home team colours, sported an all gold shirt trimmed with black on the shoulders and sides with matching all black shorts and socks, whilst the second mint-green strip, with the shirts similarly trimmed in black, was introduced to supplement it on both home and away fixtures.

Historical league performance 
Prior to this season, the history of Manchester City's performance in the English football league hierarchy since the creation of the Premier League in 1992 is summarised by the following timeline chart – which commences with the last season (1991–92) of the old Football League First Division (from which the Premier League was formed).

Friendly games

Pre-season

Thomas Cook Trophy

Competitive games

Premier League

Position in final standings

Results summary

Points breakdown 

Points at home: 39 
Points away from home: 11 

Points against "Big Four" teams: 4 
Points against promoted teams: 10

6 points: Sunderland
4 points: Blackburn Rovers, Hull City, Newcastle United
3 points: Arsenal, Aston Villa, Bolton Wanderers, Everton, Middlesbrough,
Portsmouth, Stoke City, West Brom., West Ham United, Wigan Athletic
1 point: Fulham, Liverpool
0 points: Chelsea, Manchester United, Tottenham Hotspur

Biggest & smallest 
Biggest home win: 6–0 vs. Portsmouth, 21 September 2008 
Biggest home defeats: 1–3 vs. Chelsea, 13 September 2008 & vs. Fulham, 12 April 2009 
Biggest away win: 0–3 vs. Sunderland, 31 August 2008 
Biggest away defeats: 4–2 vs. Aston Villa, 17 August 2008 
2–0 vs. Middlesbrough, 29 October 2008 & vs. Bolton Wanderers, 2 November 2008 
& vs. Portsmouth, 14 February 2009 & vs. Arsenal, 4 April 2009 
& vs. Manchester United, 10 May 2009 
Biggest home attendance: 47,331 vs. Chelsea, 13 September 2008 
Smallest home attendance: 36,635 vs. West Ham United, 24 August 2008 
Biggest away attendance: 75,464 vs. Manchester United, 10 May 2009 
Smallest away attendance: 18,214 vs. Wigan Athletic, 28 September 2008

Results by round

Individual match reports

UEFA Cup

Qualifying phase

First qualifying round

Second qualifying round

First round

Group phase

Final phase

Round of 32

Round of 16

Quarter-final

League Cup

Second round

FA Cup

Third round

Playing statistics

Starting XI 

Last updated: 21 August 2011Source: Appearance and Starting Formations.Only competitive matches.Using the most used Starting Formation.Sorted by position on pitch (from back right to front left).

Appearances (Apps.) numbers are for appearances in competitive games only
Apps. numbers denote: "Total no. of games played (No. of games played as a substitute)"
Red card numbers denote: "No. of second yellow cards / No. of straight red cards"
Yellow and red cards for the 2 domestic cups only accounted for in the TOTALS columns
*** indicates 3-match ban for violent conduct towards Rory Delap in PL game against Stoke City at the Britannia Stadium on 31 January 2009

Information current as of 24 May 2009 (end of season)

Goal scorers

All competitions

Premier League

UEFA Cup

League Cup and FA Cup 

Information current as of 24 May 2009 (end of season)

Awards

Thomas Cook Player of the Month awards 
Awarded to the player in each category that receives the most votes in a poll conducted each month on the MCFC OWS

Official Supporters Club awards

Transfers and loans

Transfers in

First team

Reserves & Academy 

[x] =

Transfers out

First team

Reserves & Academy

Loans in

First team

Reserves & Academy

Loans out

First team

Reserves & Academy

References 

2008-09
2008–09 Premier League by team
Articles which contain graphical timelines